CityLibraries Townsville is a public library service serving the City of Townsville, Queensland, Australia. It has three permanent libraries, a mobile library service and a home service. It is operated by Townsville City Council. CityLibraries serves almost 200,000 residents of Townsville and surrounding areas. CityLibraries vision is "Connections for Life" and the mission is "Working with our community to connect people, information, learning and lifestyle".

History 

Townsville was the first city in the state of Queensland to open a free public library service in 1938.

In 1986, the Shire of Thuringowa became a separate city and the library service divided; the Aitkenvale and City Library became the Townsville Library Service, and Thuringowa Library became a separate library service. Each had their own mobile library, with Thuringowa operating in the northern suburbs and Townsville in the southern suburbs. In 2008, the cities of Townsville and Thuringowa were amalgamated. The new library service became known as CityLibraries Townsville. The book The History of Townsville Library Service: An institution of help and education by Richard Sayers was published in 2008.

On amalgamation, four sections of service were created: Customer Service and Operations, Lifelong Learning, Information and Digital Services, and Collection Development.

In 2015, following a Council restructure, the four sections were renamed Customer Experience, Learning and Information Services, Planning and Business Information, and Operations Support.

Libraries

Aitkenvale Library
CityLibraries Aitkenvale is located in the central suburb of Aitkenvale, first opened in 1971. The Aitkenvale Library has lounge rooms for the non-fiction collection. Its features include a meeting room with kitchen, separate Teen Area, and an Access Information Centre. There is free wireless internet available.

Flinders Street Library
CityLibraries Flinders Street has moved location several times in the Townsville CBD. It has been located on Level 1 of the Northtown Building since 2000. This library houses the Local History Collection and the Programmed Reading Collection. There is free wireless internet available.

Thuringowa Central Library
CityLibraries Thuringowa Central was opened in 1986 and is located in Thuringowa Central. This library is home to the Parents' Collection, an outdoor children's play area, and a cafe. There is free wireless internet available.

Mobile Library
The Mobile Library Service was first established in 1981 and provides library access to residents in remote areas around Townsville. This includes the Northern Beaches area, the Alligator Creek and Cungulla area, and a weekly trip to Magnetic Island.

Home Service Library
The Home Service Library was first established in 1990 and was the first of its kind in Queensland. Customers of the Home Service Library can either enter the Library outside their house or have library staff select their books and resources for them, and have them delivered to their home.

Indigenous Resources Services

CityLibraries strives to ensure that it addresses the needs of the local Indigenous community and its members.  There are four elements within the role of the Indigenous Resource officer's position within Citylibraries Townsville:

 Family History research assistance including access to the Tindale Collection of family trees and photographs, and the Margaret Lawrie Index is available for Indigenous people in the Townsville area.  
 The Indigenous collection is available at Thuringowa Central,   Aitkenvale and Flinders street.   Space within each branch is dedicated to lending resources that have an indigenous focus or are written by Indigenous Australians.  The collections are continually updated and cover a wide reage of subjects and formats.  Fiction, Non-fiction Music, DVD's, Magazines and newspapers, biographies, History, Art. Poestry, Children's Literature, native Title, Bush Tucker and Medicines.
 Programs - Cultural and general events. An annual program of cultural, artistic, displays, family history workshops, computer training and bookclub sessions is available to the Indigenous community. Cultural events celebrated by the Indigenous community in Townsville include Sorry Day, Coming of the Light, Close the Gap NAIDOC, Reconciliation Week, Mabo Day etc.  
 Networking: Networks and Partnerships are essential to ensure the community needs are met.  Local Indigenous organisations have partnered with CityLibraries to provide events specifically targeting cultural awareness.

Local History Collection

CityLibraries Local History Collection contains information on the history of Townsville and the surrounding area.  CityLibraries Flinders Street houses and extensive collection of material related to the history of Townsville. The collection includes books, maps, photographs, pamphlet files, plans, oral histories, newspapers and microfilms.

Programs
An annual program of Local History and family history talks, educational workshops in the area of database usage, family history software, conservation and preservation is available to the community.

The Townsville Local History Collection is a living collection that is added to on a continual basis.

Lifelong Learning
CityLibraries offers a varied program of lifelong learning, including book clubs and book talks, Tech Savvy Seniors, Computers, Digital Technology, Online Help and 3D Printing sessions, Learning Links, Townsville Reads, and Open Universities Australia Connect Library.

Digital Hub

References

External links 

 CityLibraries Townsville
 Citylibraries Townsville - State Library of Queensland Public Libraries Directory

Libraries in Queensland
City of Townsville
Libraries established in 1938
1938 establishments in Australia